Baoding is a prefecture-level city in Hebei, China.

Baoding may also refer to:

Locations in China
Baoding, Chongqing (宝顶), a town in Chongqing, China
Baoding Subdistrict (保定街道), a subdistrict in Sanshan District, Wuhu, Anhui, China

Historical eras
Baoding (寶鼎, 266–269), era name used by Sun Hao, emperor of Eastern Wu
Baoding (保定, 561–565), era name used by Emperor Wu of Northern Zhou

See also
Baoting Li and Miao Autonomous County, a county in Hainan whose name is also romanised as Paoting in postal romanization
 Baoding balls